Caralee McLiesh is an Australian economist who is the current Chief Executive and Secretary to the New Zealand Treasury. She is the first woman appointed to the role, beginning her five year term in September 2019.

Early life
McLiesh holds a Bachelor of Economics with First Class Honours from the Australian National University and a PhD in Finance from the University of Melbourne. Her thesis investigated the development of a comprehensive theory of takeover activity. She has published several reports and books through the World Bank press and research papers in economic journals.

Career
Prior to leading the New Zealand Treasury, McLiesh was an Associate and Senior Associate at the Boston Consulting Group in Melbourne and worked for the International Red Cross in Bosnia, Herzegovina and Botswana as a Development Delegate. Between 2000-2007, McLiesh worked in a number of roles for the World Bank in Washington D.C. including Programme Manager and Senior Economist.

McLiesh spent 10 years at the New South Wales Treasury. In this time, she held four different roles: Deputy Secretary, Fiscal and Economic; Deputy Secretary, Agency Budget and Policy; Deputy Secretary Human and Social Services, and; Executive Director, Human and Social Services. Immediately prior to joining the New Zealand Treasury, she was Managing Director at Technical and Further Education, New South Wales.

New Zealand Treasury
McLiesh's appointment as Secretary and Chief Executive was well received by economist Eric Crampton, who praised her academic credibility and experience in advancing New South Wales social impact agenda.

Her tenure involved overseeing the economic response to the COVID-19 pandemic in New Zealand.

References

Australian economists
Year of birth missing (living people)
Living people
Australian National University alumni
University of Melbourne alumni
Australian public servants
Australian women economists